Stuart Haber is an American cryptographer and computer scientist, known for his contributions in cryptography and privacy-preserving technologies and widely recognized as the co-inventor of the blockchain. His 1991 paper "How to Time-Stamp a Digital Document”, co-authored with W. Scott Stornetta, won the 1992 Discover Award for Computer Software and is considered to be one of the most important papers in the development of cryptocurrencies.

Education 
Haber studied at Harvard University, graduating magna cum laude in 1978 with a B.A. in Mathematics. Haber earned his PhD at Columbia University in 1987 under the advisement of Zvi Galil with a thesis titled Provably Secure Multi-party Cryptographic Computation: Techniques and Applications.

Career 
In 1987, Haber joined Bell Communications Research (Bellcore) as a research scientist. In 1989, Haber met W. Scott Stornetta, his future scientific partner and collaborator, when Stornetta joined Bellcore. In 1994, Haber and Stornetta co-founded Surety Technologies, a spinoff of Bellcore. In 1995, Surety’s offering constituted the first commercial deployment of a blockchain and is currently the oldest continuously running blockchain.

Haber currently serves as a member of the advisory board for Kadena, a hybrid blockchain platform.

Contributions 
Haber's research during his time at Bellcore, along with W. Scott Stornetta, is widely considered to be the foundation for Bitcoin and other digital currencies. Haber and Stornetta are the most cited authors in Satoshi Nakamoto’s original Bitcoin white paper, of the eight citations, three reference their work.

Their 1991 paper "How to Time-Stamp a Digital Document” is where they first describe a system called "Blockchain". In this study, Haber and Stornetta sought to create mechanisms to create digital time stamps, offering a solution for maintaining the integrity of digital records and ensuring that they could not be modified or manipulated.

In 1992, Haber, Stornetta, and Dave Bayer incorporated Merkle trees into their design, improving its efficiency by allowing many document certificates to be collected into one block.

In 2018, Haber joined Kadena as an advisor. Haber is quoted saying "Kadena is working on some of the most promising innovations in proof-of-work blockchain since Bitcoin itself."

References 

American cryptographers
American computer scientists
Year of birth missing (living people)
Living people
Harvard College alumni
Columbia University alumni